Ronald Rolheiser  (born 1947 in Cactus Lake, Saskatchewan), in August 2005 was elected president of the Oblate School of Theology in San Antonio, Texas. He received his doctorate at the University of Louvain, and is a member of the Catholic Theological Society of America, the Canadian Theological Society, and the Religious Studies Association of Alberta. Before taking his current position, he taught for many years at Newman Theological College in Edmonton, Alberta. He is a Roman Catholic priest and is a specialist in the fields of spirituality and systematic theology.

Rolheiser has a regular column in the Catholic Herald which is featured in approximately 90 newspapers in five countries.

Books
The Shattered Lantern: Rediscovering a Felt Presence of God, Crossroad, 1995, rev. ed. 2001. 
Against an Infinite Horizon: The Finger of God in Our Everyday Lives, Crossroad, 1995, rev. ed. 2001. 
The Holy Longing: Guidelines for a Christian Spirituality, Doubleday, 1999. 
The Restless Heart: Finding Our Spiritual Home in Times of Loneliness, Doubleday, 2004.  
Forgotten Among the Lilies: Learning to Love Beyond Our Fears, Doubleday, 2007. 
Our One Great Act of Fidelity: Waiting for Christ in the Eucharist, Doubleday, 2011. 
Prayer: Our Deepest Longing, Franciscan Media, 2013. 
Sacred Fire: A Vision for a Deeper Human and Christian Maturity, Image, 2014. 
The Passion and the Cross, Franciscan Media, 2015. 
Bruised and Wounded: Struggling to Understand Suicide, Paraclete Press, 2017. 
Wrestling with God: Finding Hope and Meaning in Our Daily Struggles to Be Human, Image, 2018.

References

External links

 Ronald Rolheiser's Website
 

Living people
American Roman Catholic priests
Missionary Oblates of Mary Immaculate
1947 births